Ladies in Love is a 1930 talking film romance drama directed by Edgar Lewis and starring Alice Day and Johnnie Walker. A B-movie, it was produced independently by Hollywood Pictures and distributed by Chesterfield Motion Pictures Corporation.

Cast
Alice Day – Brenda Lascelle
Johnnie Walker – Harry King
Freeman Wood – Ward Hampton
Marjorie Kane – Marjorie (*as Marjorie Babe Kane)
James P. Burtis – Al Pine (*as James Burtis)
Dorothy Gould – Patsy Green
Elinor Flynn – Mary Wood
Mary Carr – Mrs. Wood
Mary Foy – Mrs. Tibbs, Landlady
Bernie Lamont – Frank Jones

References

External links
Ladies in Love @ IMDb.com

Ladies in Love, 1930(YouTube)

1930 films
Chesterfield Pictures films
1930 romantic drama films
American romantic drama films
American black-and-white films
Films directed by Edgar Lewis
1930s English-language films
1930s American films
English-language romantic drama films